Fabio Enzo (22 June 1946 – 11 January 2021) was an Italian professional footballer who played as a striker. He was born in Cavallino-Treporti.

Career
Enzo played for four seasons (46 games, 8 goals) in the Serie A for A.S. Roma and Hellas Verona F.C.

Death
He died from complications from COVID-19 during the COVID-19 pandemic in Italy.

References

External links
 Profile at Almanaccogiallorosso.it

1946 births
2021 deaths
Italian footballers
Association football forwards
Serie A players
U.S. Salernitana 1919 players
A.S. Roma players
Mantova 1911 players
A.C. Cesena players
Hellas Verona F.C. players
Novara F.C. players
Calcio Foggia 1920 players
Reggina 1914 players
Venezia F.C. players
A.S.D. La Biellese players
Footballers from Veneto
Deaths from the COVID-19 pandemic in Veneto